State Route 260 (SR 260) is a  state highway in southeastern Ohio. The route runs from SR 7 in Matamoras to SR 78 near East Union.

Route description
The route is signed as a north–south highway though it runs northwest–southeast between Matamoras and East Union. No part of the route is a part of the National Highway System.

History
SR 260 was first assigned around 1926 on its present alignment between SR 145 in Road Fork to SR 78 near East Union, entirely in Noble County. SR 245 was signed on the present SR 260 route between Matamoras and Bloomfield at SR 26 as well; the section between SR 26 and SR 145 was not a part of the state highway system at the time. By 1933, SR 260 extended east from SR 145 in Monroe County to the community of Marr. Within the next two years, the route was extended south to Bloomfield and absorbed all of SR 245. Since then, no major changes have taken effect on the routing.

Major intersections

See also

References

260
Transportation in Washington County, Ohio
Transportation in Monroe County, Ohio
Transportation in Noble County, Ohio